KDKZ-LD, virtual and UHF digital channel 18, is a low-powered AMGTV-affiliated television station licensed to Farmington, Missouri, United States and serving the northwestern parts of the Cape Girardeau, Missouri/Paducah, Kentucky market, and the southernmost part of the St. Louis market.

The station is available on cable in the Farmington vicinity via Boycom Media.

Programming
The station offers a local newscast at 10 p.m. CT weeknights, with replays at 1 a.m., therefore some AMGTV programming is pre-empted for that newscast and/or infomercials.

References

External links
Query the FCC’s TV station database for KDKZ
CDBS (RecNet) Query for KDKZ-LD

DKZ-LD
Television channels and stations established in 2011
Low-power television stations in the United States
2011 establishments in Missouri